The Assumption of the Virgin is a painting by the Italian Baroque artist Annibale Carracci which was completed in 1590 and is now in the Museo del Prado in Madrid. The same subject was depicted by Carracci on the altarpiece of the famous Cerasi Chapel in Rome.

See also
 Marian art in the Catholic Church
 Assumption of the Virgin Mary in art

1590 paintings
Paintings by Annibale Carracci
Carracci
Paintings of the Museo del Prado by Italian artists
Angels in art